Amante de lo Bueno (Lover of Good Things) is the third album by the Mexican]singer María José, and the second cover album followed by the critical success of her sophomore album Amante de lo Ajeno. Described by the singer herself as a "side b" to the last album, she stated she felt the need to record another cover album to add songs she did not get the chance to include on the past album. The album was re-released a year after its release as a Special Edition that included three newly recorded covers plus a DVD featuring concert footage from the album's accompanying tour.

Track listing

Singles

"La Ocasion Para Amarnos"

"La Ocasion Para Amarnos" ("The Occasion to Love Us") was released as the lead single from Maria Jose's third album Amante de lo Ajeno. Following the theme from her past album, the single is cover originally sung by Mexican actress and singer Daniela Romo.

"Un Nuevo Amor"

"Un Nuevo Amor" ("A New Love") was released as the second single from the album. It was originally sung by Maria Del Sol.

Charts

Certifications

References

María José (singer) albums
2010 albums